Serapias bergonii is a species of orchids found from Italy to western and southern Turkey.

References

bergonii
Orchids of Europe
Flora of Turkey
Flora of Malta